Ray Mill Island is an island in the River Thames in England at Boulter's Lock near Maidenhead, Berkshire.

It is immediately to the east of Boulter's Island, separated by the former millstream. 
 
The island is now a park administered by the Royal Borough of Windsor and Maidenhead.  It is named after the Ray family who once had a flour mill here. The mill was constructed in 1726 on the site of a previous mill, and continued to produce flour until the 1920s. 

Boulter's weir runs from the top end of the island across to the east bank near Taplow. A kayak flume has been built adjacent to the weir on the island.

For over 20 years until it was stolen in October 2011, the island housed The Companion, a memorial statue  for four local schoolboys who died in a skiing accident. A new version of the statue was unveiled in the original location in July 2012.

Statues and Memorials
 "Vintage Boys" by Lydia Karpinska. 
 "The Companions" by Eunice Goodman. 
 "Maiden with Swans" by Eunice Goodman
 "Berkshire SANDS Memorial Tree" by Gavin Southgate

See also
 Islands in the River Thames

References

External links 
 Ray Mill Island

Islands of Berkshire
Islands of the River Thames
Maidenhead